The 1994 World Short Track Speed Skating Team Championships was the 4th edition of the World Short Track Speed Skating Team Championships which took place on 20 March 1994 in Cambridge, Canada.

Medal winners

Results

Men

Women

References

External links
 Results
 Results book

World Short Track Speed Skating Team Championships
1994 World Short Track Speed Skating Team Championships